Magusipol Island (or Magusipal) is an uninhabited islet in northeastern Iloilo, Philippines. It is part of the municipality of Estancia under the jurisdiction of the barangay of Manipulon.

Location and geography

Magusipol Island is located east of Panay Island in the Visayan Sea. Magusipol is part of the Bayas Islets, which include Bayas Island, Manipulon Island, and Pangalan Island. Magusipol and Pangalan are connected by reefs, with no running water between them.

See also

 List of islands in the Philippines

References

External links
 Magusipol Island at OpenStreetMap

Islands of Iloilo
Uninhabited islands of the Philippines